Fremont Orestes Phillips (March 16, 1856 – February 21, 1936) was an American lawyer and politician who served as a U.S. Representative from Ohio for one term from 1899 to 1901.

Biography
Born in Lafayette, Ohio, Phillips attended the public schools.
He moved to Medina, Ohio, in 1873.
He attended Medina High School, Medina Normal School both in Medina and Kenyon College in Gambier, Ohio.
He studied law.
He was admitted to the bar in 1880 and commenced practice in Medina, Ohio.
He was in the Justice of the Peace.
He served as mayor of Medina 1886–1890.
He served as probate judge of Medina County 1892–1897.

Phillips was elected as a Republican to the Fifty-sixth Congress (March 4, 1899 – March 3, 1901).
He was an unsuccessful candidate for renomination in 1900.
He resumed the practice of law in Medina, Ohio.
He served as chairman of the Medina County Republican Central committee 1916–1934.

Phillips was again elected probate judge of Medina County in 1924.
He was reelected in 1928 and served until 1932.
He died in Medina, Ohio, February 21, 1936.
He was interred in Spring Grove Cemetery.

Sources

1856 births
1936 deaths
People from Allen County, Ohio
People from Medina, Ohio
Kenyon College alumni
Mayors of places in Ohio
Republican Party members of the United States House of Representatives from Ohio
Probate court judges in the United States